Baby Constance Irene Theresia Huwae (22 November 1939 – 5 June 1989) was a Dutch-born Indonesian film actress and singer. Born in Rotterdam, she had moved to Indonesia by the 1950s and taken up modelling. She entered the film industry in 1958, and gained popularity following the success of Asrama Dara (Dormitory for Girls). Over the next several years she acted in a further five films and established a girl group, the Baby Dolls. However, after she married in 1960, Huwae focused on modelling. In the 1970s she worked as a fortune teller.

Biography
Huwae was born in Rotterdam, the Netherlands, on 22 November 1939. She was of mixed Indonesian and German heritage. By the late 1950s, she had taken up modelling in the Indonesian capital of Jakarta. She was drawn into film in 1958. That year, she appeared in two films. The first, Asrama Dara (Dormitory for Girls), was an Usmar Ismail-directed comedy which followed a group of young women who lived together in a dormitory. Huwae played Maria, a flight attendant caught in a love triangle with a pilot and a merchant; this became her most famous role. The second film, Djuara Sepatu Roda (Roller-Skating Champion),  followed a competition between schoolmates to be crowned roller-skating champion.

With Rima Melati, Gaby Mambo, and Indriati Iskak, Huwae formed a girl group named the Baby Dolls in 1959;  they had all appeared together in Djuara Sepatu Roda. That year Huwae acted in three films, Gembira Ria (Joyful), Serba Salah (Gone Awry), and Tiga Mawar (Three Roses). She also participated in tours of Singapore during this time, including holding a fashion show. She was rumored to be romantically involved with President Sukarno, though she denied these claims.

Huwae married Endang Karnadi in 1960. The two had met in 1957, at a birthday party for Indriati Iskak. After marriage she focused on modelling and reduced her acting, taking only a single role, in Amor dan Humor (Love and Humor), in 1961. This romantic comedy saw Huwae play a salesclerk who must rebuff the advances of one man whilst maintaining her relationship with her boyfriend. Huwae and Karnadi had seven children before divorcing in 1978. In the 1960s Huwae converted from Catholicism to Islam, later going on the hajj with Sukarno's wife Dewi Sukarno. In 1966 she was a witness during a sex and embezzlement scandal involving former Minister of the Central Bank Yusuf Muda Dalam; The Straits Times reported that she had been gifted a house at the order of President Sukarno.

In 1978, Berita Harian reported that Huwae had been asked by the Regent of Rembang to produce a film based on the life of Kartini, an Indonesian women's emancipation figure. Though such a film was ultimately produced in 1982, it was directed by Sjumandjaja and produced by a different company. By 1979 Huwae was using the name Lokita Purnamasari and operated a boutique. She later took up work as a fortune teller, writing several columns on the subject in Jakarta-based newspapers. She was also involved in the martial arts, serving as the head of the Indonesian Karate Do Institution.

Huwae was diagnosed with leukemia in 1986. She died in a hospital in Jakarta on 5 June 1989 and was buried in Menteng Pulo. Her funeral was attended by actors such as Rima Melati, Rina Hasyim, and Ratno Timoer, musicians such as Idris Sardi, as well as the late Sukarno's wives Fatmawati and Hartini and sons Guntur Sukarnoputra and Guruh.

Filmography
During her first three years of acting, Huwae appeared in six films. After a lengthy hiatus, she had a guest appearance in the 1971 film Tiada Maaf Bagimu (There is No Forgiveness for You).

Djuara Sepatu Roda (1958)
Asrama Dara (1958)
Gembira Ria (1959)
Serba Salah (1959)
Tiga Mawar (1959)
Amor dan Humor (1961)
Tiada Maaf Bagimu (1971)

References

Works cited

External links

 

1939 births
1989 deaths
Indonesian film actresses
Indo people
Dutch emigrants to Indonesia
20th-century Indonesian women singers
Indonesian people of German descent
Indonesian former Christians
Indonesian Muslims
Deaths from leukemia
Converts to Islam from Roman Catholicism
20th-century Muslims